The UK Rock & Metal Singles Chart is a record chart which ranks the best-selling rock and heavy metal songs in the United Kingdom. Compiled and published by the Official Charts Company, the data is based on each track's weekly physical sales, digital downloads and streams. In 2018 to date, six singles have topped the 25 published charts. The first number one of the year was "Don't Stop Me Now" by Queen.
"Bohemian Rhapsody" by Queen was the most successful single of the year, spending 15 weeks at number one. "Don't Stop Me Now" by Queen has spent five weeks of the year to date at number one. "Can't Stop" by Red Hot Chili Peppers spent four weeks of the year at number one, while "Sweet Child o' Mine" was also number one for four weeks.

Bring Me the Horizon spent three weeks at number one with "Mantra", the longest run at number one for any new release in 2018.

Chart history

See also
List of UK Rock & Metal Albums Chart number ones of 2018

References

External links
Official UK Rock & Metal Singles Chart Top 40 at the Official Charts Company
The Official UK Top 40 Rock Singles at BBC Radio 1

2018 in British music
United Kingdom Rock and Metal Singles
2018